Jason Euringer is a Canadian musician.

A guitarist/vocalist and bass player, he frequently appears on recordings by artists in the Kingston, Ontario scene, including Weeping Tile, Sarah Harmer and Luther Wright and the Wrongs. Harmer's 1999 album Songs for Clem included a cover credit for Euringer.

He also appears in Harmer's 2006 documentary film Escarpment Blues.

References 

Canadian male guitarists
Living people
21st-century Canadian guitarists
Year of birth missing (living people)